The Cake was a 1960s girl group consisting of Jeanette Jacobs, Barbara Morillo and Eleanor Barooshian. They were managed and produced by Charles Greene and Brian Stone, two Sunset Strip impresarios who also managed Sonny & Cher, Buffalo Springfield and Iron Butterfly.

History
The Cake formed in New York in 1966, starting out as an a cappella vocal group singing at Steve Paul's The Scene. Barooshian and Morillo both appeared in You Are What You Eat, a 1968 documentary film produced by Peter Yarrow. In the film, Barooshian performed the Sonny & Cher hit "I Got You Babe" with Tiny Tim. She sang the male part, while Tiny Tim sang the female.

What set The Cake apart from other girl groups of the time is that they recorded their own material, as well as a number of R&B standards. Their own songs were in the vein of 1960s baroque pop with intricate madrigal-style vocal harmonies. They released two albums on Decca Records, The Cake (1967) and A Slice Of Cake (1968). Both were recorded at the Gold Star Recording Studios in Los Angeles.

Their debut single was the Jack Nitzsche and Jackie DeShannon penned song, "Baby, That's Me". The production of the song, which was arranged by Harold Battiste, mimicked the Wall of Sound technique created by Nitzsche and Phil Spector. Billboard named the song #64 on their list of 100 Greatest Girl Group Songs of All Time. Barooshian also contributed back-up vocals to "Why Are We Sleeping?", a track on The Soft Machine, the 1968 debut album by the British psychedelic rock band of the same name.

Following the break-up of The Cake in 1968, Jacobs and Barooshian toured with Dr John, who was one of the session musicians on their albums, and subsequently moved to the UK, where they became part of Ginger Baker's Air Force. Barooshian also recorded an album in Japan with Tetsu Yamauchi.  Morillo returned to the New York metropolitan area and began performing with a series of groups including The Act, Nightflyte (with Stephen Gaboury& Lincoln Goines), Ryo Kawasaki, Bamboo, Shrine and Triptic Soul.

Jacobs married Chris Wood of the English group Traffic in 1969.  Jeanette Jacobs Wood died on January 1, 1982, aged 32.

The Kevin Ayers song "Eleanor's Cake (Which Ate Her)" from the LP Joy of a Toy released in 1969 was written about Barooshian.

In 2006, after a thirty seven-year hiatus, Barooshian and Morillo reformed The Cake, to perform at a one-off Jimi Hendrix tribute concert in New York, organized by Hendrix archivist and documentary film-maker, David Kramer. The show also featured Buddy Miles, Johnny Winter, Jose Feliciano and Leon Hendrix. Their two Decca albums have been re-released on CD by Rev-Ola Records.

Jeanette Jacobs was the inspiration for the Wings song, Medicine Jar.  "Medicine Jar was born out of my frustration, caused by Jeanette’s constant use of Mandies. The song’s line "I know how you feel now your friends are dead", related to friends who had died because of drugs.” - Colin Allen from the book Little Wing: The Jimmy McCulloch Story. 

Eleanor Barooshian died in 2016 at the age of 66.

Discography

Studio albums

The Cake (Decca, 1967)
A Slice of Cake (Decca, 1968)

Compilation
More of Cake Please (Rev-Ola (Cherry Red), 2007)

Singles

"Baby, That's Me" / "Mockingbird" (Decca, 1967)
"I Know" / "You Can Have Him" (Decca, 1967)
"Fire Fly" / "Rainbow Wood" (Decca, 1968)
"P.T. 280" / "Have You Heard The News 'bout Miss Molly" (Decca, 1968)

References

External links
The Cake on Myspace
The story of The Cake at Dangerous Minds

American girl groups
American expatriates in England
American pop music groups
Musical groups from New York City
Psychedelic pop music groups
Musical groups established in 1966
Musical groups disestablished in 1968
1966 establishments in New York City